Michele Carey (born Michele Lee Henson; February 26, 1942 – November 21, 2018) was an American actress who was best known for her role as Josephine "Joey" MacDonald in the 1966 Western film El Dorado. She appeared in movies and guest-starred in television series in the 1960s and 1970s.

Early life and education
Carey was born on February 26, 1942, in Annapolis, Maryland, to Stanley Willard Henson, Jr., and Thelma Burnell Henson; her father was working as a wrestling instructor at the U.S. Naval Academy. The family soon moved to Rochester, Minnesota, where her father continued his medical studies. Carey was a piano prodigy who won a national contest at the Chicago Music Festival at age 13, and performed with the Rochester Philharmonic Orchestra.

Carey's family eventually moved to Fort Collins, Colorado, where her father practiced as a physician, becoming Fort Collins' first open-heart surgeon. She graduated from Fort Collins High School in 1960.

Career
After graduating from high school, she was signed by the John Robert Powers Agency and moved to Los Angeles in 1964 with her son to pursue a modeling career. She enjoyed success as a model, but she was more interested in acting. Aided by her beauty and trademark long, wild hair, she soon caught the eye of Hollywood producers. In 1964, she made her first television appearance on The Man from U.N.C.L.E. as a receptionist.

The following year, she did more television work, had a small part in the classic beach party film How to Stuff a Wild Bikini (1965), and acted in her first major film, the 1966 Western El Dorado, produced and directed by Howard Hawks, as high-spirited troublemaker Josephine "Joey" MacDonald, acting alongside John Wayne, Robert Mitchum, and James Caan. Carey went on to co-star in films such as the Elvis Presley vehicle Live a Little, Love a Little (1968), The Sweet Ride (1968), and Dirty Dingus Magee (1970), starring Frank Sinatra, in which she played an anachronistically miniskirted Indian girl.

On television, she appeared in guest-starring roles on episodes of The Man from U.N.C.L.E. (1964), Mission Impossible (1969), It Takes a Thief (1970), and three episodes of The Wild Wild West ("The Night of the Feathered Fury", 1967 and the two-part "The Night of the Winged Terror", 1969), the December 1969 episode "Tug-of-War" on The F.B.I., Starsky and Hutch, and Alias Smith and Jones. Carey played the title role in the 1972 Gunsmoke episode "Tara", appeared in the second The Six Million Dollar Man pilot film (1973), and co-starred with Angie Dickinson and Roy Thinnes in the Dan Curtis TV movie The Norliss Tapes that same year. In 1977, she played Belle on one episode of Man from Atlantis. She provided the recurring female computer voice in A Man Called Sloane (1979–80). Carey retired from acting in 1984, but made a brief comeback in the film In the Shadow of Kilimanjaro (1986), which was her last performance.  She also appeared as Crystal in a 1982 episode of the television series The Fall Guy.

Personal life
Carey was briefly married to her son's (her only child) father in 1961.  She was married again in the early 1970s to the man who would adopt her son.  She was also briefly married in the early 1990s to a businessman in New Mexico. Carey's last marriage was with businessman Fred G. Strebel in 1999, and she resided with him in Hillsborough and Rancho Mirage. Strebel died on December 28, 2011.

Death
Carey died at the age of 76 on November 21, 2018, of natural causes in Newport Beach, California. Her father, who had been the oldest living NCAA wrestling champion, died earlier the same year. Her mother died in 2016. She was preceded in death by her only child Kevin Troy Schwanke.

References

External links

1942 births
2018 deaths
Actresses from Maryland
American film actresses
American television actresses
People from Annapolis, Maryland
People from Hillsborough, California
People from Rancho Mirage, California
21st-century American women